Henryk Dampc (12 April 1935 – 24 March 2004) was a Polish amateur boxer who won a silver medal in the light middleweight division at the 1959 European Championships. He competed at the 1960 Summer Olympics, but lost in the third bout to Willie Fisher.

References

1935 births
2004 deaths
Boxers at the 1960 Summer Olympics
Olympic boxers of Poland
People from Wejherowo
Sportspeople from Pomeranian Voivodeship
Polish male boxers
Light-middleweight boxers
20th-century Polish people
21st-century Polish people